Rev. Thomas Le Mesurier (28 August 1756 – 14 July 1822) was a British lawyer, cleric and polemicist.

He was born on Alderney, in the Channel Islands, the fourth son of John Le Mesurier, Hereditary Governor of that island. Educated at New College, Oxford (B.A. 1778, M.A. 1782 and B.D. 1813), he initially entered the legal profession and was called to the Bar in 1781. However, he moved into the Church of England, being ordained as a Deacon in 1794 and then a Priest in 1797. In 1799 he took up his first major position as Rector of Newton Longueville, Buckinghamshire. During this time, in 1807, he was chosen to be Bampton Lecturer and preached upon the Nature and Guilt of Schism. He left in 1812 to become Rector of St Andrew's Church, Haughton-le-Skerne, County Durham – a position he held until his death.

Le Mesurier was always close to the government of the day, and after Lord Sidmouth's short period as Prime Minister became his private chaplain, advising him on how he should combine the art of politics with adherence to the principles of the Established Church. He was a staunch opponent of Roman Catholic emancipation and produced many tracts refuting the position of Catholic campaigners such as John Milner. His political and religious views were strongly held, and in August 1820 it is reported in The Times that Le Mesurier "had thought proper to stop the mouth of [a] boy with his fist" when the fourteen-year-old in Haughton-le-Skerne shouted out his support for Lambton, a local government candidate. Le Mesurier escaped without sentence.

Le Mesurier married, in 1800, Margaret, daughter of Rev. Dr. James Bandinel of Netherbury, Dorset (a previous Bampton Lecturer), and had fifteen children by her. Fourteen survived him. The resultant drain on his income caused him to write to Lord Sidmouth in January 1822 asking for the prebendal stall at Westminster vacated by Dr Blomberg. Sidmouth could do nothing. Le Mesurier died within seven months and his widow died the next year, in May, leaving their orphaned children to grow up with uncles and an aunt on the Bandinel side.

His portrait was painted by Sir William Beechey, R.A.

Publications

References 

1756 births
1822 deaths
People from Alderney
Guernsey Anglicans
Alumni of New College, Oxford
Guernsey religious leaders